Emir Alečković (born 14 August 1979) is a Bosnian international referee who refereed at 2014 FIFA World Cup qualifiers. He is the first referee from independent Bosnia and Herzegovina that has judged at a group stage of a European team competition, the UEFA Europe League game between PSV Eindhoven – AIK on 25 October 2012.

References

1979 births
Living people
Bosnian football referees